Irma de Haas (born ) is a retired Dutch female volleyball player.

She was part of the Netherlands women's national volleyball team at the 1998 FIVB Volleyball Women's World Championship in Japan.

References

1975 births
Living people
Place of birth missing (living people)
Dutch women's volleyball players